The governor of the Province of Zambales is the head of the executive branch of Zambales Provincial Government, Philippines.

On May 13, 2019, Hermogenes Ebdane defeated incumbent Governor Amor Deloso. He assumed office on June 30, 2019.

List of governors of Zambales

Spanish era

Hon. Manuel de Orendin (1802)
Hon. Miguel del Fierro (1809)
Hon. Prudencio Perez de Menor (1842)
Hon. Jose M. Rodriguez (1846)
Hon. Jose Sanchez (1848)
Hon. Hipolito Fortacion (1852)
Hon. Laureano de Caray (1869)
Hon. Vicente Camara (Revolutionary Government of Gen. Emilio Aguinaldo) (1897-1899)

American era

Hon. Potenciano Lesaca (1st Civil Governor) (1901-1903)
Hon. Juan Manday (Acting) (1903-1904)
Hon. Gabriel Alba (Acting) (1904)
Hon. Juan Lesaca (1910-1916)
Hon. Lauro Al Barretto (1916-1918)
Hon. Cleto Arnedo (Acting) (1918-1919)
Hon.Dr.Benedicto T. Esguerra (1919-1922)
Hon. Ramon Garcia (1922-1925)
Hon. Francisco Dantes (1925-1931)
Hon. Agustin N. Medina (1931-1934)
Hon. Bernardo Farrales (Commonwealth) (1934-1940)
Hon. Francisco Anonas (1940-1941)

Japanese occupation 

Hon. Francisco Dantes (1942-1943) (3-29-42 to 3-30-43)
Hon. Jose V. Corpuz (1944-1945) (1-1-44 to 1-31-45)

Current

References

 
Governors of provinces of the Philippines